Racinaea aeris-incola is a plant species in the genus Racinaea. This species is endemic to Brazil.

References

aeris-incola
Flora of Brazil